The Nestucca Formation is a geologic formation in Oregon. It preserves fossils dating back to the Bartonian to Priabonian stages of the Eocene period.

Fossil content 
The formation has provided fossils of:

Vertebrates 
Mammals
 Mammalia indet.

Fish
 Heptranchias howelli
 Galeocerdo sp.
 Raja sp.
 Isurus sp.

Invertebrates 
Gastropods
 Calliovarica oregonensis

Bivalves
 Nucinella oregona

Decapods
 Macroacaena alseanus

See also 
 List of fossiliferous stratigraphic units in Oregon
 Paleontology in Oregon
 Alsea Formation

References

Bibliography 
 
 
 
 
 

Paleogene geology of Oregon
Eocene Series of North America
Bartonian
Priabonian
Siltstone formations
Sandstone formations of the United States
Shale formations of the United States
Shallow marine deposits
Paleontology in Oregon
Formations